The following highways are numbered 991:

United States